Bauro may be,

Bauro language
Tommy Bauro
Bauro Roco forest, East Timor
Bauro, East Timor